MTV's International Viewer's Choice awards honored the best music videos as voted for by the audiences of MTV's channels around the world.  They were given out every year during the VMAs from 1989 to 2003.

History
The first International Viewer's Choice Awards were given out in 1989, with viewers in Europe, Japan, and Latin America choosing their favorite videos for that year.  The following year, MTV viewers in Australia and Brazil also received the chance to vote for their favorite video of 1990, and in 1991 viewers from Asia followed suit.  From then on, the International Viewer's Choice awards became a fixture of the MTV Video Music Awards and were handed out every year until 2003, when MTV Australia and MTV Brasil crowned their last winners.

Winners

MTV Asia
The International Viewer's Choice Award for MTV Asia was given out every year from 1991 to 1998, save for 1994.  As MTV's influence over Asia increased, different countries broke off from MTV Asia and got their own local MTV channels.  Subsequently, each new Asian MTV channel also received a separate Viewer's Choice category, namely MTV Mandarin (China and Taiwan) in 1995, MTV India in 1996, and MTV Korea in 1999.  In 1999, with a much smaller pool of member countries, this award became the International Viewer's Choice Award for MTV Southeast Asia.

The two biggest nominees in this category are Indus Creed from India and Dewa 19 from Indonesia, both of whom are the only artists in the award's history to receive two nominations.  However, Indus Creed managed to at least score a win in 1993, while Dewa 19 went away empty-handed both times.  Also, while there is no real big winner for this award, as no artist has won it more than once, Indonesia does claim the distinction of being the only country to have produced multiple winners for this category, while Thailand is the only country to have had at least one nominated artist per year of this award's existence.

Following is a list of winners of the International Viewer's Choice Award for MTV Asia.

MTV Australia
The International Viewer's Choice Award for MTV Australia was given out from 1990 to 2003.  From 1993 to 1996, however, the Australian Viewer's Choice Award was not given out since MTV Australia, the syndicated show on the Nine Network, was canceled and Australia was left without an MTV channel.  This award returned in 1997, the same year in which the present-day channel MTV Australia began broadcasting, and was given out every year (except for 2000) until 2003.

The category's biggest nominees are Silverchair, who received a total of four nominations throughout the award's history. Out of their four nominations from 1997 to 2002, Silverchair won the award twice, thus also becoming the award's biggest (and only multiple) winner.  Closely following are Kylie Minogue and Powderfinger with three nominations each, and Boom Crash Opera, Spiderbait, and Neil Finn with two (Finn received one nomination with Crowded House and one as a solo artist, though).

Due to the crossover potential that Australian musicians have in the U.S. market, a few artists have received nominations for both the Australian Viewer's Choice award and other general or professional awards in the same year.  However, an Australian artist has never won this award and another one during the main show: Midnight Oil, for example, won the Australian Viewer's Choice in 1990 but did not succeed in their bid for Best Group Video.  Meanwhile, Natalie Imbruglia succeeded in winning the Best New Artist award in 1998 but lost the Australian race to Kylie Minogue. Four years later Minogue would go through the same situation, winning Best Choreography but losing her native country's Viewer's Choice race to Holly Valance.

Following is a list of winners of the International Viewer's Choice Award for MTV Australia.

MTV Brasil
The International Viewer's Choice Award for MTV Brasil was given out every year from 1990 to 2003, thus becoming the longest-lasting International Viewer's Choice Award. From 1995 onwards, this award was incorporated into MTV Brasil's award ceremony, the MTV Video Music Brasil (VMB), as the Escolha da Audiência (Viewer's Choice).  The award's biggest winner is the band Titãs, which earned three awards between 1990 and 2002. Three other bands are tied behind them for second place, all with two wins: Sepultura, Skank, and Charlie Brown Jr. Of these, though, Skank was the only one to achieve consecutive wins, taking home the awards for 1996 and 1997.

One of the main characteristics of the Brazilian Viewer's Choice award was that there was usually a large number of videos in the running for the award each year. The official VMA press releases, program books, and websites, though, usually only listed between four and six nominees (even omitting the eventual winner from these materials in 1991). Therefore, it is difficult to ascertain who was in fact nominated for this award between 1990 and 1995 (except perhaps for 1992), as it was not until 1996 that MTV Brasil ran video packages with all of the nominees during the award presentation at the VMBs. Still, from the information that is currently available, Os Paralamas do Sucesso and Engenheiros do Hawaii are tied as the most nominated acts for this category, each with ten nominations throughout the award's history (1990 to 2003).

Following is a list of the winners of the International Viewer's Choice Award for MTV Brasil.

MTV Canada
The International Viewer's Choice Award for MTV Canada was only given out once in 2002.  Following is a list of the winners of the International Viewer's Choice Award for MTV Canada.

MTV China
The International Viewer's Choice Award for MTV China was only given out once in 2002, more-or-less replacing the MTV Mandarin Viewer's Choice Award.  Following is a list of the winners of the International Viewer's Choice Award for MTV China.

MTV Europe
The International Viewer's Choice Award for MTV Europe was given out every year from 1989 to 1997.  This award was retired in 1998 and replaced with the regional categories handed out at that year's MTV Europe Music Awards.  The award's biggest winners are Roxette and George Michael, both of whom won the award twice.  The biggest nominee, meanwhile, is Icelandic singer Björk, who received three nominations (but came out empty-handed each year).

In terms of countries, Great Britain is by far the one with the most nominations and wins, followed by Sweden.  Coincidentally, these are the only two countries to have produced multiple winners throughout the award's history, and they would have also been the only ones to produce winners had it not been for U2's win in 1995.

Because of the high crossover potential that European acts have in the U.S. market, several artists and videos received nominations for the European Viewer's Choice as well as other categories in the main ceremony, including Video of the Year and Viewer's Choice.  One curious pattern to emerge from this is that until 1996 no European artist who won a Moonman during the main show ever won the European Viewer's Choice Moonman, such as Sinéad O'Connor in 1990, Annie Lennox in 1992, and Björk in 1996.  By the same token, any European Viewer's Choice winners who were up for other awards that same night would lose their other main-show races, including George Michael in both 1993 and 1996 and U2 in 1995.  This pattern was only broken in 1997—the award's last year—when The Prodigy's "Breathe" won the European Viewer's Choice award as well as the one voted for by U.S. audiences, thus also becoming the only video in the show's history to win the Viewer's Choice award in addition to an international one.

Another curious fact that can be attributed to the European Viewer's Choice award is that it led to the first case ever of a video being nominated in two different years, as Björk's "Human Behaviour" received a European nomination in 1993 and then six more the following year.  This situation would not occur again until 2009, when Miley Cyrus's "7 Things" received a Best Editing nomination after having been nominated for Best New Artist the year before.

Following is a list of the winners of the International Viewer's Choice Award for MTV Europe.

MTV India
The International Viewer's Choice Award for MTV India was given out every year from 1996 to 2001.  Prior to that, viewers in India voted for the International Viewer's Choice Award for MTV Asia, even getting one of their artists, Indus Creed, chosen as the 1993 winner.  In the year 2000, this award was divided into two distinct categories due to the popularity of music videos taken straight from Bollywood movies in MTV India: the International Viewer's Choice Award for MTV India (Hindi Pop) and the International Viewer's Choice Award for MTV India (Hindi Film).

Udit Narayan and Asha Bhosle are tied as the biggest winners in this category, each winning the award twice.  In terms of nominations, meanwhile, Narayan is also the biggest nominee, having received a total of seven nominations throughout the award's history.  Closely following behind him are Alka Yagnik with six nominations and Asha Bhosle with five.  Following is a list of the winners of the International Viewer's Choice Award for MTV India.

MTV Internacional
The International Viewer's Choice Award for MTV Internacional was given out every year from 1989 to 1993, honoring the best Latin music video of the year.  It was named after MTV Internacional, the syndicated Latin music-video show hosted by Daisy Fuentes.  Unlike most other International Viewer's Choice awards, the MTV Internacional award was not restricted to a specific geographic region, but rather it rewarded the best video in Spanish played on the show.  Thus, artists from European countries (such as France and Spain) who recorded mainly in Spanish managed to receive nominations during the award's history.

Despite the variety of artists who received multiple nominations for this award between 1989 and 1993, no artist (or country, for that matter) won this Moonman more than once.  In 1994, this award was replaced by the International Viewer's Choice Award for MTV Latin America.  Following is a list of the winners of the International Viewer's Choice Award for MTV Internacional.

MTV Japan
The International Viewer's Choice Award for MTV Japan was given out from 1989 to 2001.  Out of all of the International Viewer's Choice awards, MTV Japan's award had one of the most uneven histories.  This award was not presented, for example, both in 1992 and 1993, despite the fact that MTV Japan had already launched again throughout Japan in 1992.  After MTV Japan ceased airing in 1998, the Japanese Viewer's Choice Award was once again not presented in 1999 and 2000; it did, however, make its second (and last) return in 2001 for that year only.  Following is a list of the winners of the International Viewer's Choice Award for MTV Japan.

MTV Korea
The International Viewer's Choice Award for MTV Korea was given out every year from 1999 to 2001. Prior to that, Korean viewers voted for the International Viewer's Choice Award for MTV Asia, even getting one of their artists, Seo Taiji & Boys, chosen as the 1996 winner.  Although there were no multiple winners during this award's brief history, singer Cho Sung Mo is the award's biggest nominee, receiving two nominations in three years.  Two other nominated artists—Lee Seung-Hwan and H.O.T.—received nominations for the MTV Asia Viewer's Choice award before the Korean category was created.  Following is a list of the winners of the International Viewer's Choice Award for MTV Korea.

MTV Latin America
The International Viewer's Choice Award for MTV Latin America was given out every year from 1994 to 2002.  In 1998, due to MTV Latin America's expansion and growing differences in musical tastes within areas of Latin America, this award was divided into two regions (North and South), each with its own set of nominees.  Ironically, both regions continued to choose the same winner until the year 2000, when the Northern region chose Shakira as its winner while the Southern region chose Los Fabulosos Cadillacs.  The following year, 2001, the Latin Viewer's Choice Award was once again divided into three different regions, a division which carried on until 2002 when this award was last handed out (North, Central/Pacific, and South/Atlantic).

There is a five-way tie for the biggest winner record, as Café Tacuba, Molotov, Ricky Martin, Los Fabulosos Cadillacs, and Shakira winning this award twice (with Molotov and Martin winning their awards in the same year for both regions of MTV Latin America).  Meanwhile, the biggest nominees are Shakira, who received five nominations in two years, and La Ley, who received five nominations in four years.  In terms of nominated videos, though,  Los Fabulosos Cadillacs and La Ley hold the record, each with four different nominated videos throughout their careers.

Lastly, in terms of countries, both Argentina and Mexico are tied for first place with 25 nominations.  Following is a list of the winners of the International Viewer's Choice Award for MTV Latin America.

MTV Mandarin
The International Viewer's Choice Award for MTV Mandarin was given out every year from 1995 to 2001, honoring the best music video of the year by a Mandarin artist from China, Taiwan, Hong Kong, or Singapore (and occasionally Mandarin-speaking artists from Japan and Malaysia received nominations).  Prior to that, voters from the region voted for the International Viewer's Choice Award for MTV Asia, even making one of its artists, Cui Jian, the first-ever winner of such award.  In 2002, this award was more-or-less replaced by the International Viewer's Choice Award for MTV China.

No artist won this award more than once despite its relative longevity in relation to the other international categories.  Furthermore, several artists are tied as the biggest nominees, each with two nominations: Jeff Chang, Valen Hsu, Karen Mok, Faye Wong, and David Tao.  Following is a list of the winners of the International Viewer's Choice Award for MTV Mandarin.

MTV Russia
The International Viewer's Choice Award for MTV Russia was given out every year from 1999 to 2001.  This award was singular in its first year for nominating three Russian artists along with three foreign, English-speaking artists.  In 2000 and 2001, though, the number of nominees was reduced to three and only Russian artists were nominated.  Rock group Mumiy Troll stands as the category's biggest nominee, having received nominations for it all three years that the award was given out (though coming out empty-handed every single time).

Most peculiarly, though, the award's first presentation in 1999 created a unique situation in VMA history, as it marked the first time that an artist won more than one International Viewer's Choice.  In fact, Ricky Martin won three Viewer's Choice awards that year (though two were for Latin America) and was also in the running for a fourth one (the American one), which was another first.  Following is a list of the winners of the International Viewer's Choice Award for MTV Russia.

MTV Southeast Asia
The International Viewer's Choice Award for MTV Southeast Asia was given out every year from 1999 to 2001.  After MTV Korea received its own separate Viewer's Choice Award in 1999, the only countries left in MTV Asia were Indonesia, Malaysia, Thailand, and the Philippines; and the channel for those countries was thus renamed MTV Southeast Asia.  Following is a list of the winners of the International Viewer's Choice Award for MTV Southeast Asia.

References

MTV Video Music Awards